The 2017–18 North Carolina A&T Aggies men's basketball team represented North Carolina Agricultural and Technical State University during the 2017–18 NCAA Division I men's basketball season. The Aggies, led by second-year head coach Jay Joyner, played their home games at the Corbett Sports Center in Greensboro, North Carolina as members of the Mid-Eastern Athletic Conference. They finished the season 20–15, 11–5 in MEAC play to finish in a tie for fourth place. They defeated Delaware State and Norfolk State to advance to the semifinals of the MEAC tournament where they lost to Hampton. They were invited to the CollegeInsider.com Tournament where they lost in the first round to Liberty.

Previous season
The Aggies finished the 2015–16 season  3–29, 1–15 in MEAC play to finish in last place. They lost in the first round of the MEAC tournament to Maryland Eastern Shore.

Roster

Schedule and results

|-
!colspan=9 style=| Non-conference regular season

|-
!colspan=9 style=| MEAC regular season

|-
!colspan=9 style=| MEAC tournament

|-
!colspan=9 style=| CIT

References

North Carolina A&T Aggies men's basketball seasons
North Carolina AandT
2018 in sports in North Carolina
2017 in sports in North Carolina
North Carolina AandT